17 is the second studio album by Mexican Latin rock band Motel.

Track listing

Personnel 

Aureo Baqueiro – Keyboard, Arranger, Producer, Vocal Director
Gustavo Borner – Mixing
Eric Corne – Production Assistant, Mixing Assistant
Pepe Damián – Drums
Rodrigo Dávila – Guitar, Keyboard, Arranger, Keyboards, Vocals
Ruy Folguera – Arranger, Brass Arrangement, String director
Joey Greco – Production Assistant, Mixing Assistant
Billy Méndez – Guitar, Vocals, background vocals
Marco Moreno – Recording
Rubén Puente – Bass
Mike Shipley – Mixing

2007 albums
Spanish-language albums
Motel (band) albums